The Order of the Cross of Grunwald was a military decoration created in Poland in November 1943 by the High Command of Gwardia Ludowa, a World War II Polish resistance movement organised by the Polish Workers Party. On 20 February 1944 it was confirmed by the State National Council and on 22 December by the Polish Committee of National Liberation and further confirmed on 17 February 1960 by the government of the People's Republic of Poland. 

The Order of the Cross of Grunwald was conferred to Polish or the allied military for valour or merit in combat with Nazi Germany. After the end of the Second World War it continued to be awarded for outstanding merit in commanding or outstanding contribution to the development of the Polish Armed Forces. It was disestablished by the President of Poland via Parliament in 1992.

See also
Battle of Grunwald
Grunwald Swords

Notes

References
 
 
 

Awards established in 1943
Awards disestablished in 1992
Military awards and decorations of Poland